Fadel Showban (born 23 May 1978) is an Egyptian boxer. He competed in the men's welterweight event at the 2000 Summer Olympics.

References

1978 births
Living people
Egyptian male boxers
Olympic boxers of Egypt
Boxers at the 2000 Summer Olympics
Place of birth missing (living people)
African Games medalists in boxing
Welterweight boxers
African Games bronze medalists for Egypt
Competitors at the 1999 All-Africa Games
20th-century Egyptian people
21st-century Egyptian people